In 1932, the Highway Department of the U.S. state of Connecticut (now known as the Connecticut Department of Transportation), decided to completely renumber all its state highways. The only exceptions were the U.S. Highways and some of the New England Interstate Routes. Between 1922 and 1932, Connecticut used a state highway numbering system shared with the other New England states. Major inter-state trunk routes used numbers in the 1-99 range, primary intrastate highways used numbers in the 100-299 range, and secondary state highways used numbers in the 300+ range.

In 1926, at the behest of the American Association of State Highway Officials, four of the nine New England Interstate Routes that passed through Connecticut became U.S. Routes. At this time, the adjacent states of Massachusetts and Rhode Island abandoned the New England highway numbering system but Connecticut still used it for several more years. This led to a situation where U.S. Routes were co-signed with New England Routes (in particular U.S. Route 5/New England Route 2 and U.S. Route 6/New England Route 3).

In 1932, the Highway Department decided to abandon the New England numbering system as well by completely reorganizing the state highway system. The renumbering completely altered the previously existing state highway numbers. In addition, not only were the highways renumbered, some old state highways were combined, some were split, some were deleted, and some new ones were also created.

Highways in 1932
The table below lists the highways that were created in the 1932 renumbering, indicating which old state highways they were created from, and their current status:

References

See also
List of State Routes in Connecticut

State highways in Connecticut
State Highway Renumbering (Connecticut), 1932
State Highway Renumbering (Connecticut), 1932
History of Connecticut
Highway renumbering in the United States